The 1999–2000 Albanian National Championship was the 61st season of the Albanian National Championship, the top professional league for association football clubs, since its establishment in 1930. The season began on 18 September 1999 and concluded on 7 June 2000. Tirana  began the season as defending champions  1998–99 season and Shqiponja was the only team promoted from the Kategoria e Dytë as the league was reduced from 16 teams to 14.

Tirana retained their title, as they won it for the 19th time and their 5th time in the previous 6 seasons. Partizani were the first team to be relegated, followed by relegation/promotion playoff losers Elbasani down to the Kategoria e Dytë.

Teams

Promotion and relegation
A total of 14 teams competed in the 1999–2000 season, 2 less than the previous where 16 teams competed. Of these 14 teams, 13 were from the 1998–99 season with Shqiponja being the only promoted side from the Kategoria e Dytë. 3 sides from the 1998–99 season were relegated, and they were Burreli, Laçi and Besa.

Stadia and last season

Regular season

League table

Results

Playoffs

Championship playoff 
Tirana and Tomori finished the season level on points so the Albanian Football Association decided to organise a championship playoff game to determine the winner of the 1999–2000 Albanian National Championship. The game was played at Ruzhdi Bizhuta Stadium in Elbasan and Tirana won on penalties following a 1–1 draw to retain their title. Had the league been decided on goal difference Tirana would have won it, but if it had been decided on their head-to-head record Tomori would have won it.

Intertoto Cup playoff 
Vllaznia and Bylis finished the season level on points so the Albanian Football Association decided to organise a playoff game to determine which side will take the Intertoto Cup place. Although Teuta finished 3rd and would have taken the Intertoto Cup place had they not won the 1999–2000 Albanian Cup, meaning they forfeited their Intertoto Cup place in order to take up their UEFA Cup place for winning the Albanian Cup. Vllaznia won the game 4–3 at the Selman Stërmasi Stadium in Tiranë.

Relegation/promotion playoff 
Elbasani finished in penultimate place in the league, and although they were not automatically relegated like Partizani, they were placed in a relegation/promotion playoff against the Kategoria e Dytë playoff runners-up Besa. The game took place on 7 June 2000 in Tiranë and Besa won 2–1, thanks to goals from Armand Daiu and Demneri, to earn promotion to the 2000–01 National Championship, with Elbasani being relegated down to the Kategoria e Dytë.

Season statistics

Top scorers

Notes

References

Kategoria Superiore seasons
1
Albanian Superliga